Walter Bentley may refer to:

 W. O. Bentley (Walter Owen Bentley, 1889–1971), founder of Bentley Motors
 Walter Bentley (died 1359), English captain at the 1352 Battle of Mauron
 Walter Bentley (actor) (1849–1927), Scottish-Australian Shakespearean actor